The 16th Madras Native Infantry may refer to:

91st Punjabis (Light Infantry) which formed the 1st Battalion, 16th Madras Native Infantry in 1800 
92nd Punjabis which formed the 2nd Battalion, 16th Madras Native Infantry in 1800
76th Punjabis which was called the 16th Madras Native Infantry in 1824